Hallerbach  may refer to:

 Hallerbach (Windhagen), a locality in the municipality Windhagen in Rhineland-Palatinate, Germany
 Hallerbach (Holtebach), a river of North Rhine-Westphalia, Germany